Stockholm is a National Area of Sweden. The National Areas are a part of the Nomenclature of Territorial Units for Statistics (NUTS) of Sweden.

Geography

Subdivision

See also

External links

 Hierarchical list of the Nomenclature of territorial units for statistics - NUTS and the Statistical regions of Europe
 Overview map of EU Countries - NUTS level 1
 SVERIGE - NUTS level 2
 SVERIGE - NUTS level 3
 Correspondence between the NUTS levels and the national administrative units
 List of current NUTS codes
 Download current NUTS codes (ODS format)
 Counties of Sweden, Statoids.com

References

 
National Areas of Sweden
NUTS 2 statistical regions of the European Union